Elinor Sneshell (fl. 1593) was an English barber-surgeon, active during the reign of Elizabeth I of England.

In the 1593 Returns of Strangers in the Metropolis, she was listed as a widow originating from Valenciennes who had been resident in London for 26 years.  Alongside 
Elizabeth Moulthorne of Antwerp, Sneshell was one of only two known female barber-surgeons who practised during this period.

References 

16th-century English women
16th-century women scientists
16th-century English medical doctors
People from Valenciennes
French expatriates in England